Salamat Utarbayev (born 7 November 1981) is a Kazakhstani judoka.

He won a bronze medal in the extra-lightweight (60 kg) category of the 2006 Asian Games, having won the bronze medal match against Jia Yunbing of China.

He currently resides in Aqtöbe.

External links
2006 Asian Games profile

1981 births
Living people
Kazakhstani male judoka
Judoka at the 2008 Summer Olympics
Olympic judoka of Kazakhstan
Asian Games medalists in judo
Judoka at the 2006 Asian Games
Asian Games bronze medalists for Kazakhstan
Medalists at the 2006 Asian Games
20th-century Kazakhstani people
21st-century Kazakhstani people